Canadians are people identified with the country of Canada. This connection may be residential, legal, historical or cultural. For most Canadians, many (or all) of these connections exist and are collectively the source of their being Canadian.

Canada is a multilingual and multicultural society home to people of groups of many different ethnic, religious, and national origins, with the majority of the population made up of Old World immigrants and their descendants. Following the initial period of French and then the much larger British colonization, different waves (or peaks) of immigration and settlement of non-indigenous peoples took place over the course of nearly two centuries and continue today. Elements of Indigenous, French, British, and more recent immigrant customs, languages, and religions have combined to form the culture of Canada, and thus a Canadian identity. Canada has also been strongly influenced by its linguistic, geographic, and economic neighbour—the United States.

Canadian independence from the United Kingdom grew gradually over the course of many years following the formation of the Canadian Confederation in 1867. The First and Second World Wars, in particular, gave rise to a desire among Canadians to have their country recognized as a fully-fledged, sovereign state, with a distinct citizenship. Legislative independence was established with the passage of the Statute of Westminster, 1931, the Canadian Citizenship Act, 1946, took effect on January 1, 1947, and full sovereignty was achieved with the patriation of the constitution in 1982. Canada's nationality law closely mirrored that of the United Kingdom. Legislation since the mid-20th century represents Canadians' commitment to multilateralism and socioeconomic development.

Term
The word Canadian originally applied, in its French form, Canadien, to the colonists residing in the northern part of New France—in what is today Prince Edward Island, Nova Scotia, New Brunswick, Quebec, and Ontario—during the 16th, 17th, and 18th centuries.

When, following the transfer of New France to the British Crown in 1763, Prince Edward, Duke of Kent and Strathearn (a son of King George III), addressed, in English and French, a group of rioters at a poll in Charlesbourg, during the election of the Legislative Assembly of Lower Canada in June 1792, he stated, "I urge you to unanimity and concord. Let me hear no more of the odious distinction of English and French. You are all His Britannic Majesty's beloved Canadian subjects." It was the first-known use of the term Canadian to mean both French and English settlers in the Canadas.

Population

As of 2010, Canadians make up only 0.5% of the world's total population, having relied upon immigration for population growth and social development. Approximately 41% of current Canadians are first- or second-generation immigrants, and 20% of Canadian residents in the 2000s were not born in the country. Statistics Canada projects that, by 2031, nearly one-half of Canadians above the age of 15 will be foreign-born or have one foreign-born parent. Indigenous peoples, according to the 2016 Canadian census, numbered at 1,673,780 or 4.9% of the country's 35,151,728 population.

Immigration

While the first contact with Europeans and indigenous peoples in Canada had occurred a century or more before, the first group of permanent settlers were the French, who founded the New France settlements, in present-day Quebec and Ontario; and Acadia, in present-day Nova Scotia and New Brunswick, during the early part of the 17th century.

Approximately 100 Irish-born families would settle the Saint Lawrence Valley by 1700, assimilating into the Canadien population and culture. During the 18th and 19th century; immigration westward (to the area known as Rupert's Land) was carried out by "Voyageurs"; French settlers working for the North West Company; and by British settlers (English and Scottish) representing the Hudson's Bay Company, coupled with independent entrepreneurial woodsman called coureur des bois. This arrival of newcomers led to the creation of the Métis, an ethnic group of mixed European and First Nations parentage.

The British conquest of New France was preceded by a small number of Germans and Swedes who settled alongside the Scottish in Port Royal, Nova Scotia, while some Irish immigrated to the Newfoundland Colony. In the wake of the British Conquest of New France in 1760 and the Expulsion of the Acadians, many families from the British colonies in New England moved over into Nova Scotia and other colonies in Canada, where the British made farmland available to British settlers on easy terms. More settlers arrived during and after the American Revolutionary War, when approximately 60,000 United Empire Loyalists fled to British North America, a large portion of whom settled in New Brunswick. After the War of 1812, British (including British army regulars), Scottish, and Irish immigration was encouraged throughout Rupert's Land, Upper Canada and Lower Canada.

Between 1815 and 1850, some 800,000 immigrants came to the colonies of British North America, mainly from the British Isles as part of the Great Migration of Canada. These new arrivals included some Gaelic-speaking Highland Scots displaced by the Highland Clearances to Nova Scotia. The Great Famine of Ireland of the 1840s significantly increased the pace of Irish immigration to Prince Edward Island and the Province of Canada, with over 35,000 distressed individuals landing in Toronto in 1847 and 1848. Descendants of Francophone and Anglophone northern Europeans who arrived in the 17th, 18th, and 19th centuries are often referred to as Old Stock Canadians.

Beginning in the late 1850s, the immigration of Chinese into the Colony of Vancouver Island and Colony of British Columbia peaked with the onset of the Fraser Canyon Gold Rush. The Chinese Immigration Act of 1885 eventually placed a head tax on all Chinese immigrants, in hopes of discouraging Chinese immigration after completion of the Canadian Pacific Railway. Additionally, growing South Asian immigration into British Columbia during the early 1900s led to the continuous journey regulation act of 1908 which indirectly halted Indian immigration to Canada, as later evidenced by the infamous 1914 Komagata Maru incident.

The population of Canada has consistently risen, doubling approximately every 40 years, since the establishment of the Canadian Confederation in 1867. In the mid-to-late 19th century, Canada had a policy of assisting immigrants from Europe, including an estimated 100,000 unwanted "Home Children" from Britain. Block settlement communities were established throughout Western Canada between the late 19th and early 20th centuries. Some were planned and others were spontaneously created by the settlers themselves. Canada was now receiving a large number of European immigrants, predominantly Italians, Germans, Scandinavians, Dutch, Poles, and Ukrainians.
Legislative restrictions on immigration (such as the continuous journey regulation and Chinese Immigration Act, 1923) that had favoured British and other European immigrants were amended in the 1960s, opening the doors to immigrants from all parts of the world. While the 1950s had still seen high levels of immigration by Europeans, by the 1970s immigrants were increasingly Chinese, Indian, Vietnamese, Jamaican, and Haitian. During the late 1960s and early 1970s, Canada received many American Vietnam War draft dissenters. Throughout the late 1980s and 1990s, Canada's growing Pacific trade brought with it a large influx of South Asians, who tended to settle in British Columbia. Immigrants of all backgrounds tend to settle in the major urban centres. The Canadian public, as well as the major political parties, are tolerant of immigrants.

The majority of illegal immigrants come from the southern provinces of the People's Republic of China, with Asia as a whole, Eastern Europe, Caribbean, Africa, and the Middle East. Estimates of numbers of illegal immigrants range between 35,000 and 120,000.

Citizenship and diaspora

Canadian citizenship is typically obtained by birth in Canada or by birth or adoption abroad when at least one biological parent or adoptive parent is a Canadian citizen who was born in Canada or naturalized in Canada (and did not receive citizenship by being born outside of Canada to a Canadian citizen). It can also be granted to a permanent resident who lives in Canada for three out of four years and meets specific requirements. Canada established its own nationality law in 1946, with the enactment of the Canadian Citizenship Act which took effect on January 1, 1947. The Immigration and Refugee Protection Act was passed by the Parliament of Canada in 2001 as Bill C-11, which replaced the Immigration Act, 1976 as the primary federal legislation regulating immigration. Prior to the conferring of legal status on Canadian citizenship, Canada's naturalization laws consisted of a multitude of Acts beginning with the Immigration Act of 1910.

According to Citizenship and Immigration Canada, there are three main classifications for immigrants: family class (persons closely related to Canadian residents), economic class (admitted on the basis of a point system that accounts for age, health and labour-market skills required for cost effectively inducting the immigrants into Canada's labour market) and refugee class (those seeking protection by applying to remain in the country by way of the Canadian immigration and refugee law). In 2008, there were 65,567 immigrants in the family class, 21,860 refugees, and 149,072 economic immigrants amongst the 247,243 total immigrants to the country. Canada resettles over one in 10 of the world's refugees and has one of the highest per-capita immigration rates in the world.

As of a 2010 report by the Asia Pacific Foundation of Canada, there were 2.8 million Canadian citizens abroad. This represents about 8% of the total Canadian population. Of those living abroad, the United States, Hong Kong, the United Kingdom, Taiwan, China, Lebanon, United Arab Emirates, and Australia have the largest Canadian diaspora. Canadians in the United States constitute the greatest single expatriate community at over 1 million in 2009, representing 35.8% of all Canadians abroad. Under current Canadian law, Canada does not restrict dual citizenship, but Passport Canada encourages its citizens to travel abroad on their Canadian passport so that they can access Canadian consular services.

Ethnic ancestry

According to the 2021 Canadian census, over 450 "ethnic or cultural origins" were self-reported by Canadians. The major panethnic origin groups in Canada are: European, North American, Asian, North American Indigenous, African, Latin, Central and South American, Caribbean, Oceanian, and Other. Statistics Canada reports that 35.5% of the population reported multiple ethnic origins, thus the overall total is greater than 100%.

The country's ten largest self-reported specific ethnic or cultural origins in 2021 were Canadian (accounting for 15.6 percent of the population), followed by English (14.7 percent), Irish (12.1 percent), Scottish (12.1 percent), French (11.0 percent), German (8.1 percent), Chinese (4.7 percent), Italian (4.3 percent), Indian (3.7 percent), and Ukrainian (3.5 percent).

Of the 36.3 million people enumerated in 2021 approximately 25.4 million reported being "white", representing  69.8 percent of the population. The indigenous population representing 5 percent or 1.8 million individuals, grew by 9.4 percent compared to the non-Indigenous population, which grew by 5.3 percent from 2016 to 2021.  One out of every four Canadians or 26.5 percent of the population belonged to a non-White and non-Indigenous visible minority, the largest of which in 2021 were South Asian (2.6 million people; 7.1 percent), Chinese (1.7 million; 4.7 percent) and Black (1.5 million; 4.3 percent).

Between 2011 and 2016, the visible minority population rose by 18.4 percent. In 1961, less than two percent of Canada's population (about 300,000 people) were members of visible minority groups. The 2021 Census indicated that 
8.3 million people, or almost one-quarter (23.0 percent) of the population reported themselves as being or having been a landed immigrant or permanent resident in Canada—above  the 1921 Census previous record of 22.3 percent. In 2021 India, China, and the Philippines were the top three countries of origin for immigrants moving to Canada.

Culture

Canadian culture is primarily a Western culture, with influences by First Nations and other cultures. It is a product of its ethnicities, languages, religions, political, and legal system(s). Canada has been shaped by waves of migration that have combined to form a unique blend of art, cuisine, literature, humour, and music. Today, Canada has a diverse makeup of nationalities and constitutional protection for policies that promote multiculturalism rather than cultural assimilation. In Quebec, cultural identity is strong, and many French-speaking commentators speak of a Quebec culture distinct from English Canadian culture. However, as a whole, Canada is a cultural mosaic: a collection of several regional, indigenous, and ethnic subcultures.

Canadian government policies such as official bilingualism; publicly funded health care; higher and more progressive taxation; outlawing capital punishment; strong efforts to eliminate poverty; strict gun control; the legalizing of same-sex marriage, pregnancy terminations, euthanasia and cannabis are social indicators of Canada's political and cultural values. American media and entertainment are popular, if not dominant, in English Canada; conversely, many Canadian cultural products and entertainers are successful in the United States and worldwide. The Government of Canada has also influenced culture with programs, laws, and institutions. It has created Crown corporations to promote Canadian culture through media, and has also tried to protect Canadian culture by setting legal minimums on Canadian content.

Canadian culture has historically been influenced by European culture and traditions, especially British and French, and by its own indigenous cultures. Most of Canada's territory was inhabited and developed later than other European colonies in the Americas, with the result that themes and symbols of pioneers, trappers, and traders were important in the early development of the Canadian identity. First Nations played a critical part in the development of European colonies in Canada, particularly for their role in assisting exploration of the continent during the North American fur trade. The British conquest of New France in the mid-1700s brought a large Francophone population under British Imperial rule, creating a need for compromise and accommodation. The new British rulers left alone much of the religious, political, and social culture of the French-speaking , guaranteeing through the Quebec Act of 1774 the right of the Canadiens to practise the Catholic faith and to use French civil law (now Quebec law).

The Constitution Act, 1867 was designed to meet the growing calls of Canadians for autonomy from British rule, while avoiding the overly strong decentralization that contributed to the Civil War in the United States. The compromises made by the Fathers of Confederation set Canadians on a path to bilingualism, and this in turn contributed to an acceptance of diversity.

The Canadian Armed Forces and overall civilian participation in the First World War and Second World War helped to foster Canadian nationalism, however, in 1917 and 1944, conscription crisis' highlighted the considerable rift along ethnic lines between Anglophones and Francophones. As a result of the First and Second World Wars, the Government of Canada became more assertive and less deferential to British authority. With the gradual loosening of political ties to the United Kingdom and the modernization of Canadian immigration policies, 20th-century immigrants with African, Caribbean and Asian nationalities have added to the Canadian identity and its culture. The multiple-origins immigration pattern continues today, with the arrival of large numbers of immigrants from non-British or non-French backgrounds.

Multiculturalism in Canada was adopted as the official policy of the government during the premiership of Pierre Trudeau in the 1970s and 1980s. The Canadian government has often been described as the instigator of multicultural ideology, because of its public emphasis on the social importance of immigration. Multiculturalism is administered by the Department of Citizenship and Immigration and reflected in the law through the Canadian Multiculturalism Act and section 27 of the Canadian Charter of Rights and Freedoms.

Religion

Canada as a nation is religiously diverse, encompassing a wide range of groups, beliefs and customs. The preamble to the Canadian Charter of Rights and Freedoms references "God", and the monarch carries the title of "Defender of the Faith". However, Canada has no official religion, and support for religious pluralism (Freedom of religion in Canada) is an important part of Canada's political culture. With the role of Christianity in decline, it having once been central and integral to Canadian culture and daily life, commentators have suggested that Canada has come to enter a post-Christian period in a secular state, with irreligion on the rise. The majority of Canadians consider religion to be unimportant in their daily lives, but still believe in God. The practice of religion is now generally considered a private matter throughout society and within the state.

The 2011 Canadian census reported that 67.3% of Canadians identify as being Christians; of this number, Catholics make up the largest group, accounting for 38.7 percent of the population. The largest Protestant denomination is the United Church of Canada (accounting for 6.1% of Canadians); followed by Anglicans (5.0%), and Baptists (1.9%). About 23.9% of Canadians declare no religious affiliation, including agnostics, atheists, humanists, and other groups. The remaining are affiliated with non-Christian religions, the largest of which is Islam (3.2%), followed by Hinduism (1.5%), Sikhism (1.4%), Buddhism (1.1%), and Judaism (1.0%).

Before the arrival of European colonists and explorers, First Nations followed a wide array of mostly animistic religions. During the colonial period, the French settled along the shores of the Saint Lawrence River, specifically Latin Church Catholics, including a number of Jesuits dedicated to converting indigenous peoples; an effort that eventually proved successful. The first large Protestant communities were formed in the Maritimes after the British conquest of New France, followed by American Protestant settlers displaced by the American Revolution. The late nineteenth century saw the beginning of a substantive shift in Canadian immigration patterns. Large numbers of Irish and southern European immigrants were creating new Catholic communities in English Canada. The settlement of the west brought significant Eastern Orthodox immigrants from Eastern Europe and Mormon and Pentecostal immigrants from the United States.

The earliest documentation of Jewish presence in Canada occurs in the 1754 British Army records from the French and Indian War. In 1760, General Jeffrey Amherst, 1st Baron Amherst attacked and won Montreal for the British. In his regiment there were several Jews, including four among his officer corps, most notably Lieutenant Aaron Hart who is considered the father of Canadian Jewry. The Islamic, Jains, Sikh, Hindu, and Buddhist communities—although small—are as old as the nation itself. The 1871 Canadian Census (first "Canadian" national census) indicated thirteen Muslims among the populace, while the Sikh population stood at approximately 5,000 by 1908. The first Canadian mosque was constructed in Edmonton, in 1938, when there were approximately 700 Muslims in Canada. Buddhism first arrived in Canada when Japanese immigrated during the late 19th century. The first Japanese Buddhist temple in Canada was built in Vancouver in 1905. The influx of immigrants in the late 20th century, with Sri Lankan, Japanese, Indian and Southeast Asian customs, has contributed to the recent expansion of the Jain, Sikh, Hindu, and Buddhist communities.

Languages

A multitude of languages are used by Canadians, with English and French (the official languages) being the mother tongues of approximately 56% and 21% of Canadians, respectively. As of the 2016 Census, just over 7.3 million Canadians listed a non-official language as their mother tongue. Some of the most common non-official first languages include Chinese (1,227,680 first-language speakers), Punjabi (501,680), Spanish (458,850), Tagalog (431,385), Arabic (419,895), German (384,040), and Italian (375,645). Less than one percent of Canadians (just over 250,000 individuals) can speak an indigenous language. About half this number (129,865) reported using an indigenous language on a daily basis. Additionally, Canadians speak several sign languages; the number of speakers is unknown of the most spoken ones, American Sign Language (ASL) and Quebec Sign Language (LSQ), as it is of Maritime Sign Language and Plains Sign Talk. There are only 47 speakers of the Inuit sign language Inuktitut.

English and French are recognized by the Constitution of Canada as official languages. All federal government laws are thus enacted in both English and French, with government services available in both languages. Two of Canada's territories give official status to indigenous languages. In Nunavut, Inuktitut and Inuinnaqtun are official languages, alongside the national languages of English and French, and Inuktitut is a common vehicular language in territorial government. In the Northwest Territories, the Official Languages Act declares that there are eleven different languages: Chipewyan, Cree, English, French, Gwich'in, Inuinnaqtun, Inuktitut, Inuvialuktun, North Slavey, South Slavey, and Tłįchǫ. Multicultural media are widely accessible across the country and offer specialty television channels, newspapers, and other publications in many minority languages.

In Canada, as elsewhere in the world of European colonies, the frontier of European exploration and settlement tended to be a linguistically diverse and fluid place, as cultures using different languages met and interacted. The need for a common means of communication between the indigenous inhabitants and new arrivals for the purposes of trade, and (in some cases) intermarriage, led to the development of Mixed languages. Languages like Michif, Chinook Jargon, and Bungi creole tended to be highly localized and were often spoken by only a small number of individuals who were frequently capable of speaking another language. Plains Sign Talk—which functioned originally as a trade language used to communicate internationally and across linguistic borders—reached across Canada, the United States, and into Mexico.

See also

 Canuck
 List of Canadians
 Persons of National Historic Significance
 List of prime ministers of Canada

Notes

References

Bibliography

Further reading

External links

Canada Year Book 2010 - Statistics Canada
Canada: A People's History - Teacher Resources - Canadian Broadcasting Corporation
Persons of National Historic Significance in Canada - Parks Canada
Multicultural Canada - Department of Canadian Heritage
The Canadian Immigrant Experience - Library and Archives Canada
The Dictionary of Canadian Biography – Library and Archives Canada
Canadiana: The National Bibliography of Canada – Library and Archives Canada

 
Ethnic groups in Canada
North American people
Nansen Refugee Award laureates